Dighinala is an upazila of Khagrachari District in the Division of Chittagong, Bangladesh.

History

Dighinala, the biggest upazila of Khagrachhari zila in respect of area, came into 
existence in 1916 as a thana and was upgraded to upazila in 1984. It is said that in the long past, 
Tripura Maharaja Govinda Manikya Bahadur Debbarma dug a big pond (meaning Dighi in Bangla) by the side of a canal (meaning 
Nala in Bangla). This upazila was under Tripura Kingdom used to known as "Reangdesh" 

It is generally believed that the upazila might have originated its name from above 
two words Dighi and Nala.

Geography
Dighinala Upazila (khagrachhari district) area 694.12 km2, located in between 23°04' and 23°44' north latitudes and in between 91°56' and 92°11' east longitudes. It is a hilly area. It is bounded by tripura state of India on the north, langadu upazila on the south, baghaichhari upazila on the east, panchhari and khagrachhari sadar upazilas and Tripura state on the west. Golamoon, Karmi Mura, Lutiban, Kuradia hills are notable.

Demographics
According to the 2011 Bangladesh census, Dighinala has a population of 103,392,with a growth rate of 1.08%;Males 53,054;Female 50,338. Dighinala had a literacy rate of 46.2%(7+ Year)

Administration
Dighinala Upazila is divided into five union parishads: Babuchhara, Boalkhali, Dighinala, Kabakhali, and Merung. The union parishads are subdivided into 20 mauzas and 245 villages.

Economy
Main sources of income Agriculture 65.53%, non-agricultural labourer 8.51%, commerce 9.70%, service 5.01%, construction 0.42%, religious service 0.20%, rent and remittance 0.10% and others 10.53%.

Ownership of agricultural land Landowner 46.96%, landless 53.04%; agricultural landowner: urban 25.85% and rural 50.57%.

Main crops Paddy, ginger, garlic, mustard, nut, sesame, potato, vegetables.

Main fruits Banana, jackfruit.

Fisheries, dairies and poultries Poultry 6.

Education
Literacy rate and educational institutions Average literacy 47.5%; male 56.1%, female 38%. Educational institutions: Choto Merung High School, DIGHINALA BORADOM HIGH SCHOOL, Dighinala Government College, Dighinala Government High School, Dighinala Model Girls' School, Hashinpur High School, Anath Ashram Abashik High School, Babuchhara High School, Udal Bagan High School, Rasik Nagar Dakhil Madrasa.Trabonia high school

Transport
Communication facilities Pucca road 91 km, semi-pucca road 34 km, mud road 280 km.

Extinct or nearly extinct traditional transport Bullock cart. Connected to the zila headquarters by metalled roads. Bus, minibus, three wheelers ply over the upazila. Chander Gari (local four wheeled jeep) is a popular transport used to ply in the hill area of upazila.

Points of interest
 Sajek
 10 No. Jhorna
 Suspension Bridge
The Dhigi

See also

Upazilas of Bangladesh
Districts of Bangladesh
Divisions of Bangladesh

References

Dighinala